Manora Fort is a fort that was built to protect the harbour of Karachi.  Originally erected as a mud fortress by the Talpur Mirs in 1797, the fort was captured by the British in 1839 - after which they seized control of Karachi and lower Sindh.

History

Establishment 
Manora Fort was built by the Talpur dynasty in 1797 in order to protect the port, which handled trade with Oman and Bahrain. The fort was used to repel attacks by Qasimi pirates who threatened and sometimes raided Karachi Harbor in the early 19th century. Accounts of piracy have been contested, and piracy may have been simply used as a casus belli excuse for the East India Company to seize control of the Persian Gulf region.

Capture by the British 
On 1 February 1839 a British ship, HMS Wellesley (1815), anchored off the island of Manora. On 3 February, the ship opened fire on the fort. When British troops stormed the fort, they reportedly found it guarded by 4 or 5 men, who had no gun to fire back with, and so the fort was quickly surrendered by Wussul Ben Butcha, and Karachi with most of Pakistan captured. 

After the fort was captured, the building was used as a residence for the Master-Attendant of the Karachi Port. St. Paul's church was built in the immediate vicinity in 1865. In 1888, the old fort was mostly removed, and the battery was reinforced. A lighthouse was built by the British presence in 1889 to assist vessels approaching Karachi harbor.

Post-independence 
After independence in 1947, Manora Fort became the main base of the Pakistan Navy, with berths for naval vessels located along the eastern edge of the island. The island has been governed as a military cantonment since then. The fort now serves as the General Headquarters of the Pakistan Marines.

Gallery

See also 
Manora Cantonment
Manora, Karachi
Karachi
Pakistan Navy
List of UNESCO World Heritage Sites in Pakistan
List of forts in Pakistan
List of museums in Pakistan

External links 
 Manora Fort, Karachi
 Manora Fort Photo

References 

Forts in Sindh
Karachi
Pakistan Navy bases
Military headquarters in Pakistan